Catapsephis apicipuncta is a moth in the family Crambidae. It was described by George Hampson in 1899. It is found in New Guinea, where it has been recorded from Fergusson Island.

References

Moths described in 1899
Pyraustinae